The 2023 Volta a Catalunya is a road cycling stage race that will take place between 20 and 26 March 2023.

Teams 
All 18 UCI WorldTeams and seven UCI ProTeams made up the 25 teams that participated in the race.

UCI WorldTeams

 
 
 
 
 
 
 
 
 
 
 
 
 
 
 
 
 
 

UCI ProTeams

Route

Stages

Stage 1 
20 March 2023 — Sant Feliu de Guíxols to Sant Feliu de Guíxols,

Stage 2 
21 March 2023 — Mataró to Vallter,

Stage 3 
22 March 2023 — Olost to La Molina,

Stage 4 
23 March 2023 — Llívia to Sabadell,

Stage 5 
24 March 2023 — Tortosa (Terres de l'Ebre) to Lo Port (Terres de l'Ebre),

Stage 6 
25 March 2023 — Martorell to Molins de Rei,

Stage 7 
26 March 2023 — Barcelona to Barcelona,

Classification leadership table

Classification standings

General classification

Points classification

Mountains classification

Young rider classification

Team classification

References

External links 
 

2023
Volta a Catalunya
Volta a Catalunya
Volta a Catalunya
Current sports events